"Om igen", written by Ingela 'Pling' Forsman and Bobby Ljunggren, is a ballad in Swedish, performed by Swedish pop singer Lena Philipsson at the Swedish Melodifestivalen 1988. "Om igen" finished second.

The single peaked at #10 at the Swedish singles chart. The song was also at Svensktoppen for 12 weeks during the period 10 April-4 September 1988, with a second place during the debut week as best result there. It also became a Svensktoppen hit, being at the list for 12 weeks during the period 10 April-4 September 1988, peaking at #2.

The song won the 1988 Second Chance Contest.

Kikki Danielsson was asked to compete with "Om igen", but said no.

Chart positions

References

Lena Philipsson songs
Melodifestivalen songs of 1988
Songs written by Bobby Ljunggren
Songs with lyrics by Ingela Forsman
Swedish-language songs
1988 songs